Hua Tamariki (born 5 November 1983) is a New Zealand rugby union player. He plays as a Number 8 or Blindside Flanker. Tamariki represents the Southland Stags in the Air New Zealand Cup.

References

External links
 Southland Profile

1983 births
Living people
Otago rugby union players
New Zealand rugby union players
Rugby union players from Tokoroa
Rugby union flankers
People educated at Verdon College